Grace Andrews may refer to:

Grace Andrews (mathematician) (1869–1951), American mathematician
Grace Andrews, a schooner wrecked on  Dog Island, Florida
Grace Andrews (TOWIE), in The Only Way is Essex
Grace Andrews, a character in the film The Hitcher and the remake

Andrews, Grace